Side Streets is a 1998 Merchant Ivory film directed by Tony Gerber, about the intersecting lives of diverse people in New York City. It stars Valeria Golino, Shashi Kapoor, Shabana Azmi, Miho Nikaido, Art Malik, Victor Argo, Rosario Dawson, and Jennifer Esposito.

Plot summary

Cast

References

External links
 
 
 

1998 films
Merchant Ivory Productions films
1998 drama films
1990s English-language films